Schistomitra is a moth genus in the family Epicopeiidae described by Arthur Gardiner Butler in 1881. The genus was regarded as a monotypic taxon for a long time, however a second species was newly described in 2019.

Species
Schistomitra funeralis Butler, 1881
Schistomitra joelmineti Huang & Wang, 2019

References

Epicopeiidae
Moths of Japan